Series 51 to Series 59 may refer to:

 Area 51 (series), the game series
 nRF51 series, Nordic Semiconductor chips series
 GAZ-51, USSR truck series
 52 series, the Japanese train series
 52 Super Series, the yacht racing series
 Series 54 (SNCB),  diesel locomotives series
 Linksys WRT54G series, line of routers
 Mitsui 56 series, cargo ship series
 WPC 56, British TV series
 KiHa 59 series, the Japanese train series